Theofilos Kouroupis (born 11 April 1990) is a Greek professional footballer who plays as a left back in Aiolikos .

Kouroupis started his career with Agrotikos Asteras having also spells with Irodotos, Frenaros, Eordaikos, Ethnikos Sochos, Korinthos, Anagennisi Giannitsa, Iraklis, Apollon Kalamarias, Pierikos, Rodos and Vereya. Today he plays in Aiolikos .

Career
Kouroupis started his career in the youth ranks of Agrotikos Asteras before moving to Cretan club Irodotos. After leaving Irodotos he moved to Cypriot Second Division club Frenaros and Eordaikos. In the 2011–12 season he played for Delta Ethniki club Ethnikos Sochos F.C., making his debut for the club in an away defeat for the opening matchday against Olympiakos Kymina. Totally he appeared in 21 matches for the club. On 5 July 2012 Kouroupis signed for Korinthos appearing only once for the club. In the 2013 summer transfer window he signed for Anagennisi Giannitsa F.C. He debuted for the club in the opening matchday of the season against Kerkyra. He signed for Iraklis on 30 January 2014. On 1 August 2014 he signed for Apollon Kalamarias. After a year with the club he signed with Pierikos and Rodos. On 1 July 2018, he signed with Bulgarian club Vereya for an undisclosed fee. A year later he signed with another Bulgarian club Vitosha Bistritsa.

References

1990 births
Living people
Greek footballers
Greek expatriate footballers
Apollon Pontou FC players
Iraklis Thessaloniki F.C. players
Korinthos F.C. players
FC Vereya players
FC Vitosha Bistritsa players
First Professional Football League (Bulgaria) players
Expatriate footballers in Bulgaria
Association football defenders
Expatriate footballers in Cyprus
Cypriot Second Division players
Footballers from Thessaloniki